In enzymology, a 2-chlorobenzoate 1,2-dioxygenase is an enzyme that catalyzes the chemical reaction

2-chlorobenzoate + NADH + H+ + O2  catechol + chloride + NAD+ + CO2

The 4 substrates of this enzyme are 2-chlorobenzoate, NADH, H+, and O2, whereas its 4 products are catechol, chloride, NAD+, and CO2.

This enzyme belongs to the family of oxidoreductases, specifically those acting on paired donors, with O2 as oxidant and incorporation or reduction of oxygen. The oxygen incorporated need not be derived from O2 with NADH or NADPH as one donor, and incorporation of two atoms o oxygen into the other donor.  The systematic name of this enzyme class is 2-chlorobenzoate,NADH:oxygen oxidoreductase (1,2-hydroxylating, dechlorinating, decarboxylating). This enzyme is also called 2-halobenzoate 1,2-dioxygenase.  This enzyme participates in benzoate degradation via coa ligation.  It employs one cofactor, iron.

References

 

EC 1.14.12
NADPH-dependent enzymes
NADH-dependent enzymes
Iron enzymes
Enzymes of unknown structure